Grampianfjella is a mountain ridge in Prins Karls Forland, Svalbard. The ridge is named after the Scottish Grampian Mountains. Among the mountains of the ridge are Monacofjellet, Jessiefjellet, Charlesfjellet, Parnasset, Phippsaksla, Nipenosa, Phippsfjellet, Djevletommelen, Klørne, Neglene and Kasinoet.

References

Mountains of Prins Karls Forland